Father is the male parent of a child.

Father may also refer to:

Name
 Daniel Fathers (born 1966), a British actor
 Father Yod (1922–1975), an American owner of one of the country's first health food restaurants

Cinema
 Father (1966 film), a Hungarian film directed by István Szábo
 Father (1990 film), an Australian film directed by John Power
 Father (2000 film), a Chinese film directed by Wang Shuo
 Father (2011 film), a French film directed by Pasquale Squitieri
 Father (2020 film), a Serbian film directed by Srdan Golubović
 Fathers (film), a 2020 Cambodian film
 The Father (1979 film), a Bengali film by Kazi Hayat
 The Father (1996 film), an Iranian feature film by Majid Majidi
 The Father (2015 film), a Syrian drama film
 The Father (2019 film), a Bulgarian film directed by Kristina Grozeva and Petar Valchanov
 The Father (2020 film), a British film directed by French playwright Florian Zeller

Literature and theatre
 "The Father," a short story by Raymond Carver from his collection Will You Please Be Quiet, Please?
 The Father (Dunlap play), a 1789 play by William Dunlap
 The Father (Strindberg play), an 1887 play by Swedish playwright August Strindberg
 The Father (Osborne play), a 1989 play by English playwright John Osborne
 The Father (Zeller play), a 2012 play by French playwright Florian Zeller
 Fathers (book), a collection of 49 personal father essays and poems
 Father (Fullmetal Alchemist), the main antagonist of the Fullmetal Alchemist manga and 2009 anime

Music

Bands and artists
 Father (rapper), an American rapper
 Father MC, African American rapper
 Father (band), a Croatian heavy metal band

Songs
 "Father" (LL Cool J song), 1997
 "Father" (Ms. Dynamite song), 2005
 "Father", by Amy Grant from her album Amy Grant, 1977
 "Father", by Bizzy Bone from his album The Gift, 2001
 "Father", by Calibretto 13 from their album Adventures in Tokyo, 2002
 "Father", by Cat Stevens from his album Back to Earth, 1978
 "Father", by Dala from Best Day, 2012
 "Father", by Demi Lovato from their album Confident, 2015
 "Father", by Manowar from their album Thunder in the Sky, 2009
 "Father", by Mötley Crüe from their EP Quaternary, 1994
 "Father", by Pillar from their album Above, 2000
 "Father", by Sabaton from their EP Weapons Of The Modern Age, 2022

Society
 Father (honorific)

Religion
 God the Father, in many religions, the supreme God given the title and attributions of a father
 Holy Father (disambiguation)
 Father, style (manner of address) for a clergyman, especially a priest
 Church Fathers, early and influential theologians, eminent Christian teachers and great bishops

Places
Father Lake (Doda Lake tributary), a waterbody in Québec, Canada`

See also
 Father of the Nation
 Father Time, a personification of time
 List of people considered father or mother of a field
 Name of the Father, which relates to the psychoanalytic concept of the Father